Fluticasone furoate, sold under the brand name Flonase Sensimist and formerly Veramyst, among others, is a corticosteroid for the treatment of non-allergic and allergic rhinitis administered by a nasal spray. It is also available as an inhaled corticosteroid to help prevent and control symptoms of asthma. It is derived from cortisol. Unlike fluticasone propionate, which is only approved for children four years and older, fluticasone furoate is approved in children as young as two years of age when used for allergies.

It was approved for medical use in the United States in April 2007, and in the European Union in November 2008. In 2020, fluticasone was the 23rd most commonly prescribed medication in the United States, with more than 24million prescriptions.

Society and culture

Brand names 
In the US it is marketed by GlaxoSmithKline for asthma as Arnuity Ellipta and is only available with a prescription. It is marketed over-the-counter for allergic rhinitis as Flonase Sensimist. The Veramyst brand name has been discontinued in the US. It is also marketed as Allermist (Japan, アラミスト) and Avamys (Australia, Canada, EU, South Africa, South America, Mexico, Israel, Italy, India, Taiwan and South Korea).

The combination drug fluticasone furoate/vilanterol, marketed as Breo Ellipta (US, Canada, New Zealand) and Relvar Ellipta (EU, UK), is approved for use in the United States for long-term maintenance treatment of airflow obstruction in people with chronic obstructive pulmonary disease (COPD). It is also approved for the treatment of asthma.

See also
 Fluticasone furoate/umeclidinium bromide/vilanterol
 Fluticasone propionate/salmeterol

References

External links
 

Corticosteroid esters
Furoate esters
GSK plc brands
Glucocorticoids
Organofluorides
2-Furyl compounds